Dave's Falls is a waterfall in Marinette County, Wisconsin,  south of Amberg, in the town of Amberg. It is off U.S. Highway 141 between Old 38 Road and Old Highway 141 Road.

External links
Dave's Falls on Google Maps
Waterfalls of the Great Lakes Region and Beyond - Dave's Falls

Landforms of Marinette County, Wisconsin
Waterfalls of Wisconsin
Tourist attractions in Marinette County, Wisconsin